José Ignacio López Sanjuán (born 1 April 1940) is a Spanish retired footballer who played as a defender, and a current coach.

Playing career
Born in Villaobispo de Otero, León, Castile and León, Sanjuán made his senior debut with CD Basconia on 6 November 1960, starting in a 1–0 away win against Terrassa FC in the Segunda División.

In the 1962 Sanjuán moved to La Liga with Real Valladolid. He made his debut in the competition on 14 April 1963, playing the full 90 minutes in a 2–1 home win against Atlético Madrid.

After appearing rarely Sanjuán returned to the second level, joining UP Langreo. In 1966 he left the club and subsequently resumed his career in the Tercera División, representing Gimnàstic de Tarragona (two stints) and Terrassa FC.

Post-playing career
After being an assistant manager at his last club Gimnàstic, Sanjuán was appointed manager of Vinaròs CF in 1973. He subsequently returned to Nàstic, being manager of the club in 1976.

In July 1977 Sanjuán was named manager of Catalonia neighbours UE Lleida. He subsequently returned to Vinaròs in 1981, and remained in the fourth and third levels for the following seasons, coaching CD Tortosa, Cultural y Deportiva Leonesa, CD Eldense, Polideportivo Almería and CD Burriana.

In May 1990 Sanjuán was appointed at the helm of Villarreal CF, with the side in the fourth level. With the Yellow Submarine he achieved two consecutive promotions, taking the club back to the second division after a 20-year absence.

Sanjuán was also in charge of SD Ponferradina during the 1996–97 campaign, being sacked in January 1997.

References

External links
 
 

1940 births
Living people
Sportspeople from the Province of León
Spanish footballers
Footballers from Castile and León
Association football defenders
La Liga players
Segunda División players
Tercera División players
CD Basconia footballers
Real Valladolid players
UP Langreo footballers
Gimnàstic de Tarragona footballers
Terrassa FC footballers
Spanish football managers
Segunda División managers
Segunda División B managers
Tercera División managers
Villarreal CF managers
Gimnàstic de Tarragona managers
UE Lleida managers
Cultural Leonesa managers
Pontevedra CF managers
CD Eldense managers
SD Ponferradina managers
CP Almería managers